Na Noi is a district (amphoe) in Nan province, northern Thailand.

History
Na Noi was originally named Wiang Si Sa Ket (เวียงศรีษะเกษ). In 1899 it became part of Nan Province. Though it was originally planned to merge Sisaket and Tha Pla Subdistrict into one district, in 1903 Tha Pla was merged into Uttaradit Province. In 1917 the name of the district was changed, to avoid confusion with Sisaket province.

Geography
Neighboring districts are, from the north clockwise, Wiang Sa, Laos, and Ban Khok of Uttaradit province); Na Muen and Rong Kwang of Phrae province.

The main river is the Nan in the eastern part of the district. The Nam Haeng River flows through Na Noi town to dump into the Nan River further east. Upstream of Na Noi town is the Nam Haeng Reservoir.

Also in the west of the district is Si Nan National Park, protecting the forested Phi Pan Nam mountains which separate the valleys of the Nan and the Yom Rivers.

Erosion formed the strange shapes named Hom Chom, found not far north of the town Na Noi. The mounds, some rather sharp, remained when rainwater and brooks cut into the sandstone.

The eastern part of the district is in the Luang Prabang Range mountain area of the Thai highlands.

Slogan
The slogan of the district is "City of earth pillars, area of sweet tamarind, legendary Doi Phachu, praise the chedi Phra That Phlu Chae".

Administration
The district is divided into seven sub-districts (tambons), which are further subdivided into 66 villages (mubans). Na Noi is a township (thesaban tambon) and covers parts of tambon Na Noi. There are a further seven tambon administrative organizations (TAO).

References

External links
amphoe.com

Na Noi